Fundy-River Valley was a provincial electoral district for the Legislative Assembly of New Brunswick, Canada.  It was established in the 1994 redistribution as Grand Bay-Westfield and, though its boundaries were not changed much in 2006, it was decided to change its name to Fundy-River Valley to better reflect that it includes much more than the town of Grand Bay-Westfield but the Maces Bay area on the Fundy Shore as well as the river valley up to Evandale and Welsford.

Members of the Legislative Assembly

Election results

Fundy-River Valley

Grand Bay-Westfield

References

External links 
Website of the Legislative Assembly of New Brunswick

Former provincial electoral districts of New Brunswick